Sternarchorhamphus muelleri is a species of ghost knifefish that occurs in the Amazon and Orinoco river basins in tropical South America. It is the only member of its genus.

References

Apteronotidae
Fish of South America
Fish of Brazil
Fish of Peru
Monotypic freshwater fish genera
Taxa named by Carl H. Eigenmann